Austral was an Australian bus manufacturer in Geebung, Brisbane.

History
Austral was originally formed as Athol Hedges. It was later renamed Domino Hedges, then Domino before becoming Austral in 1982 when purchased by the Australian Manufacturing Group. It originally bodied buses diversifying into integral buses and coaches (body and chassis) in the 1970s.

In December 1988 Austral was sold to JRA Limited who also owned Denning, Austral's largest rival in the coach market. Both continued to operate separately until 1990 when the Denning plant in Acacia Ridge was closed and production transferred to the Austral factory.

From 1992 the combined business was rebranded as Austral Denning. In July 1996, along with JRA's other bus bodybuilding operations, it was sold to the Clifford Corporation and rebranded Austral Pacific. This resulted in Ansair Orana Volvo B10BLE buses being bodied at Geebung for Brisbane Transport. Following the collapse of Clifford Corporation the plant closed in November 1998.

References

External links
Bus Australia gallery

Bus manufacturers of Australia
Fire service vehicle manufacturers
Manufacturing companies based in Brisbane
Australian companies disestablished in 1998
Manufacturing companies disestablished in 1998